is a remote-controlled robot double of King Kong introduced in the 1966 animated television series The King Kong Show and featured again in the 1967 film King Kong Escapes. The robot was created by Dr. Who (who is not to be confused with the British television series or its main character) to try to replicate the giant ape King Kong. It would reappear in Godzilla, King of the Monsters rebuilt by Dr. Mad Oniyama to fight Godzilla.

Overview
In the Toho movie King Kong Escapes, Mechani-Kong was built by Dr. Who to dig for Element X, a large core containing a natural abundance of nuclear power. However, Mechani-Kong was not resistant enough to dig out the element, as the robot's circuits were destroyed by its magnetic waves. Dr. Who then kidnaps the real Kong to dig for the element, placing him in a hypnotic trance. Kong eventually breaks out of his trance and swims to Tokyo, where he and Mechani-Kong fight atop the Tokyo Tower. After a long battle in which both of them nearly fall off the tower, Dr. Who's associate Madame X rips out the robot's control cords, causing Mechani-Kong to malfunction. Mechani-Kong falls to its destruction from the top of the tower, mirroring Kong's demise in the original film.

Mechani-Kong first appeared in the tenth episode of The King Kong Show (in the segment titled "MechaniKong") as one of several monsters in the series used by Dr. Who to fight Kong. King Kong defeated the robot by knocking it into the ocean, which caused it to short circuit.

Mechani-Kong was 20 meters (65 feet) tall and weighed 15,000 metric tons (16,534 short tons). But in it's appearance in Godzilla, King of the Monsters manga Mechani-Kong was scaled up to 100 meters in order to fight the more larger Heisei Godzilla.

Abilities
In the movie, aside from its great strength, Mechani-Kong has high-intensity lights in its eyes which can be used to blind opponents. Although not as agile as the real Kong, Mechani-Kong possesses greater endurance. It is later modified with attachments on its waist which it uses to carry multiple grenade-like explosives and still later with a dome on the top of its head which features a flashing light that can hypnotize its foes.

In the Godzilla, King of the Monsters manga Mechani-Kong was strong enough to restrain Godzilla himself until the ASTOL-MB93 aircraft shot at it and made it loose it's grip on Godzilla.

Appearances
After abandoning a remake of King Kong vs. Godzilla in 1991, Toho attempted to produce a film called Godzilla vs. Mechani-Kong. However, though Toho had created the live-action Mechani-Kong, Turner demanded payment for using King Kong's image. The film was dropped in favor of Godzilla vs. King Ghidorah.

However depsite it Mechani-King did appear in Godzilla, King of the Monsters Kodansha manga where the main villain of the series Dr. Mad Oniyama rebuilt the robot ape as Mechani-Kong II and scaled it up to 100 meters in size to assist  Mechagodzilla III in fighting Godzilla however both robots would be destroyed by Godzilla in combat later on.

Film
 King Kong Escapes (1967)

Television
 The King Kong Show (1966-1969)

Cultural references
 Mechani-Kong inspired the creation of Mechagodzilla for Godzilla vs. Mechagodzilla.
 Mechani-Kong also inspired the creation of an enemy character named 'Mecha Pong' from Capcom's 1989 arcade game Strider.
 Akira Ifukube utilized a reworked version of Mechani-Kong's theme for Mechagodzilla in the Heisei Godzilla film Godzilla vs. Mechagodzilla II.
 In Godzilla: The Series, an animated series sequel to the 1998 remake/reboot film Godzilla, the Robo-Yeti from the episode "Competition" is a homage to Mechani-Kong except for its Yeti-like costume, chest missiles and whip-like cables filled with electricity, and was used by the Japanese military led by Dr. Ifukube.
 In The Grim Adventures of Billy and Mandy episode "Giant Billy and Mandy All Out Attack" Mandy gets a robot named Mecha-Gorillasaur in order to stop a parody of King Ghidorah called "Kittyra."
Mechani-Kong's head shows up in aMuppet Show episode.

References

King Kong (franchise) characters
Fictional robots
Kaiju
Toho monsters
Science fiction film characters
Fantasy film characters
Fictional characters with superhuman strength
Fictional monsters
Film characters introduced in 1967
Godzilla characters
Horror film villains